

The Bridge in Nicholson Township is a historic lenticular truss bridge located in Nicholson Township, Wyoming County, Pennsylvania. It spans Tunkhannock Creek.

It was listed on the National Register of Historic Places in 1988.

Gallery

See also
List of bridges documented by the Historic American Engineering Record in Pennsylvania

References

External links

Bridges in Wyoming County, Pennsylvania
Bridges completed in 1876
Road bridges on the National Register of Historic Places in Pennsylvania
Historic American Engineering Record in Pennsylvania
National Register of Historic Places in Wyoming County, Pennsylvania
Metal bridges in the United States
Truss bridges in the United States